Nicolás Kicker was the defending champion but lost in the quarterfinals to Facundo Bagnis.

Gerald Melzer won the title after defeating Bagnis 6–3, 6–1 in the final.

Seeds

Draw

Finals

Top half

Bottom half

References
Main Draw
Qualifying Draw

Challenger Ciudad de Guayaquil - Singles
2017 Singles